Old Mill Creek is a  year-round stream in southern Marin County, California, United States. Old Mill Creek is a tributary to Arroyo Corte Madera del Presidio, which, in turn, flows to Richardson Bay at Mill Valley's municipal Bayfront Park and  Bothin Marsh.

History
Old Mill Creek, as is the town of Mill Valley, is named for the sawmill there, built in 1834 by John Reed, grantee of Rancho Corte Madera del Presidio.

Watershed

Old Mill Creek has a small decommissioned dam and reservoir above the convergence with Cascade Creek. The dam was built by noted engineer Michael M. O'Shaughnessy for The Tamalpais Land & Water Co. for water supply to Mill Valley.

Ecology
Old Mill Creek and its Cascade Creek tributary are spring-fed perennial streams. 

Historically, the Arroyo Corte Madera del Presidio (Mill Valley) watershed was used by coho salmon (Oncorhynchus kisutch) for spawning and rearing. The last record of coho salmon in Marin County tributaries to San Francisco Bay was on September 18, 1981 when Dr. Rob Leidy reported collecting two juveniles from Corte Madera Creek and two from Old Mill Creek. NOAA Fisheries has identified both the Corte Madera Creek and Arroyo Corte Madera del Presidio watersheds as critical habitat for coho salmon. In its 2004 "Recovery Strategy for California Coho Salmon" the California Department of Fish and Game recommended restoration of the Arroyo Corte Madera del Presidio watersheds' historic coho salmon habitat. This is one of only two San Francisco Bay Area streams considered in the Department's 2004 Strategy to be essential to the recovery of coho salmon in California.

Steelhead/rainbow trout (Oncorhynchus mykiss) continue to enter Old Mill Creek and reproduce successfully, despite multiple partial fish barriers. The culverted reach of Old Mill Creek beneath the post office in Mill Valley is a severe barrier to fish passage evaluation. According to a restoration feasibility study for the Arroyo Corte Madera del Presidio drainage, Old Mill Creek provides the best remaining salmonid habitat in the watershed. A 2003 stream crossing and fish passage evaluation identified key passage barriers under the Post Office and at Cascade Drive. A California Department of Fish and Wildlife Stream Inventory Report concluded in 2009 that Old Mill Creek should be managed as an anadromous, natural production stream.

See also
 Mount Tamalpais
 Arroyo Corte Madera del Presidio
 List of watercourses in the San Francisco Bay Area
 Richardson Bay

References

Rivers of Marin County, California
Mill Valley, California
Rivers of Northern California